The 10th government of Turkey (11 November 1938 – 25 January 1939) was a short-term government in the history of Turkey. It is also called Second Bayar government.

Background 
Mustafa Kemal Atatürk, the president and the founder of modern Turkey, died on 10 November. İsmet İnönü was elected as the new president, and consequently the 9th government of Turkey (First Bayar government) resigned. İnönü appointed Celal Bayar of the Republican People's Party (CHP) for the second time. The Second Bayar government was similar to the First Bayar government, but Interior Minister Şükrü Kaya and Foreign Minister Tevfik Rüştü Aras of the previous government were left out of the cabinet, replaced by Refik Saydam and Şükrü Saracoğlu, respectively, both of whom would be the future prime ministers.

The government
In the list below, the  cabinet members who served only a part of the cabinet's lifespan are shown in the column "Notes".

Aftermath
Celal Bayar surprisingly resigned on 25 January 1939 with the pretext of the upcoming general elections to be held on 26 March.

References

Cabinets of Turkey
Republican People's Party (Turkey) politicians
1938 establishments in Turkey
1939 disestablishments in Turkey
Cabinets established in 1938
Cabinets disestablished in 1939
Members of the 10th government of Turkey
5th parliament of Turkey
Republican People's Party (Turkey)